Paul Montgomery Shore (born February 1, 1968) is an American actor, comedian, and filmmaker best known for his roles in 1990s comedy films. Shore began as a stand-up comedian at the age of 17, before becoming an MTV VJ in 1989. This led to a starring role in the comedy film Encino Man in 1992, which was a modest hit. He followed this with leading man vehicles, including Son in Law (1993) and Bio-Dome (1996). Shore provided the voice of Robert "Bobby" Zimuruski in A Goofy Movie and its direct-to-video sequel, An Extremely Goofy Movie.

Early life
Shore was born Paul Montgomery Shore, the son of Sammy Shore (1927–2019), a comedian who co-founded The Comedy Store with Rudy De Luca, and Mitzi Shore (née Saidel; 1930–2018), who owned and operated the Comedy Store from 1974 until her death, after receiving it in her divorce settlement. Shore was raised Jewish and grew up in Beverly Hills, California. He graduated from Beverly Hills High School in 1986.

Career

Stand-up career
Inspired by his parents' work in comedy and show business, a 17-year-old Shore made his stand-up debut at the Alley Cat Bistro in Culver City. "Everyone else in school was filling out their SAT applications, but I just passed mine back. I knew I wasn't going to go to college." Shore was mentored by Sam Kinison and opened several of his sets. While touring the comedy club circuit, Shore cultivated an alter ego persona called "The Weasel". "The Weasel" involved Shore speaking in a surfer parlance, heavily peppered with dudespeak slang such as "edged", "melons" and "grinding" as well as his catchphrase, "Hey, BU-DDY."

MTV
Shore's big break came as an on-air MTV VJ, a position he held from 1989 to 1994. At the height of his MTV fame, Shore had his own show, Totally Pauly, serving as a host on MTV's annual Spring Break parties. He also released a music video, "Lisa, Lisa, the One I Adore".

Film career
In 1992, Shore starred in Encino Man, which was a modest hit. The film's success propelled Shore to star in additional personalized vehicles, albeit increasingly less successful: Son in Law (1993), In the Army Now (1994), Jury Duty (1995), and Bio-Dome (1996). All five films received sharply negative reviews, with the last three each holding a rating below 10% at Rotten Tomatoes; in addition, each of the movies grossed less at the box office than the one before. Describing Shore's performances in these movies, film critic Roger Ebert wrote, "Shore bypasses all categories to achieve a kind of transcendent fingernails-on-the-blackboard effect." In 1997, Shore starred in the eponymous TV show Pauly, which was cancelled after five episodes aired. Shore made a cameo appearance in the American rock band Limp Bizkit music video "N 2 Gether Now" as a pizza deliveryman and a briefer appearance in "Break Stuff". The Golden Raspberry Awards has recognized Shore's film performances several times, awarding him Worst New Star of the Year for Encino Man, Worst Actor of the Year for Bio-Dome, Worst New Star of the Decade for the 1990s, and nominating him for Worst Actor of the Century (which he lost to Sylvester Stallone).

In 2003, Shore produced, wrote, directed and starred in Pauly Shore Is Dead, a semi-autobiographical mockumentary, which gave him the best reviews of his career (57% on Rotten Tomatoes, far above his 1990s films), and in 2005, starred in the short-lived reality television series Minding the Store. In 2010, Shore starred in Adopted, which sees him traveling to Africa to adopt a child. 

In March 2018, Shore appeared as himself in episode 10 of the TV series Alone Together.

Discography

Filmography

References

External links

 
 
 
 
 

1968 births
Living people
American male film actors
American male musicians
Beverly Hills High School alumni
American satirists
Screenwriters from California
American stand-up comedians
American male voice actors
Jewish male comedians
20th-century American male actors
21st-century American male actors
Jewish American comedians
Jewish American male actors
Film directors from Los Angeles
Comedians from California
20th-century American comedians
21st-century American comedians
21st-century American Jews